Aleksei Vladimirovich Khrushchyov (born 21 August 1992) is a Russian football midfielder.

Club career
He made his debut in the Russian Second Division for FC Syzran-2003 on 17 April 2012 in a game against FC Oktan Perm.

He made his Russian Football National League debut for FC Yenisey Krasnoyarsk on 18 March 2015 in a game against FC Anzhi Makhachkala.

References

External links
 Career summary by sportbox.ru
 

1992 births
People from Oktyabrsk
Living people
Russian footballers
Association football midfielders
Crimean Premier League players
PFC Krylia Sovetov Samara players
FC Khimki players
FC Yenisey Krasnoyarsk players
FC Sokol Saratov players
FC Kyzyltash Bakhchisaray players
Sportspeople from Samara Oblast